Innovator is potato variety that is oblong in shape with a smooth skin. It is a popular potato variety in Europe and is gaining popularity in North America as a frying and baking potato. The skin of the potato variety is russeted, similar to that of a Russet Burbank potato. Innovator also has shallow eyes with a cream coloured flesh.

Origin 
Innovator was bred in the Netherlands and registered in 2004. It is the result of a cross between Shepody x RZ-84-2580.

Uses 
Due to the Innovator's dry matter content they are well suited for french fry making, boiling or baking.

Botanical features 
Innovator is a medium to large plant with stems that are semi erect. The leaves of the plants are a yellow green and are moderately close to one another. When the plant flowers it produces many white flowers. The variety produces tubers that are large and oblong in shape with a tan coloured skin. The potato variety also produces large sprouts that are red-violet in colour.

Disease resistance 
Innovator potatoes are resistant to potato wart and Globodera pallida (one of the two species of potato cyst nematode). It is also resistant to late foliar leaf blight, Potato virus X and Potato virus Y. The variety is slightly resistant to common scab and tuber late blight.

References

Potato cultivars
Potatoes